Jan Nicolaas Dreyer (born 9 September 1976) is a former South African cricketer.  Dreyer was a right-handed batsman who bowled right-arm medium pace.  He was born at Amanzimtoti, Natal Province.

Dreyer made his debut in South African domestic cricket for Western Transvaal in a List A match against Natal in the 1995/96 season.  His debut in first-class cricket came for North West against Transvaal B in the 1996/97 season.  From 1996/97 to 2001/02, he represented North West in 18 first-class matches.  He also played first-class cricket for KwaZulu-Natal and KwaZulu-Natal B in the 1998/99 season.  In total, Dreyer played a total of 26 first-class matches, the last of which came for North West against Gauteng.  In his 26 first-class matches, he scored 248 runs at a batting average of 10.33, with a high score of 40.  In the field he took 6 catches.  With the ball he took 69 wickets at a bowling average of 39.98, with two five wicket hauls and best figures of 5/81.

As well as representing Western Transvaal in List A cricket, he also represented North West and KwaZulu-Natal in that format of the game.  He played 29 List A matches in South Africa, the last of which came for North West against Griqualand West in the 1999/00 season.  He played a single List A match in English County Cricket for the Warwickshire Cricket Board against the Kent Cricket Board in the 2000 NatWest Trophy.  In his 30 career List A matches, he scored 175 runs at an average of 12.50, with a high score of 45*.  In the field he took 3 catches, while with the ball he took 28 wickets an average of 37.35, with best figures of 3/38.

References

External links
Jan Dreyer at Cricinfo
Jan Dreyer at CricketArchive

1976 births
Living people
People from Amanzimtoti
South African cricketers
North West cricketers
KwaZulu-Natal cricketers
Warwickshire Cricket Board cricketers